Héctor Francisco Cardona González (April 19, 1936 – June 16, 2017) was a Puerto Rican sports executive who served as the longtime President of the Puerto Rico Olympic Committee (COPUR) from 1991 until 2008, as well as the executive vice-president of International Amateur Boxing Association. He was serving as the President of the Central American and Caribbean Sports Organization (CASCO) at the time of his death in June 2017.

Most recently, Cardona was unanimously re-elected to a fourth term as President of CACSO by the 46th CACSO General Assembly in November 2015. 

Cardona was born on April 19, 1936, in Naguabo, Puerto Rico. He died from cancer on June 16, 2017, in San Juan, Puerto Rico, at the age of 81.

References

1936 births
2017 deaths
People from Naguabo, Puerto Rico
Presidents of the Puerto Rico Olympic Committee
Puerto Rican sports executives and administrators
Puerto Rico at the Olympics